Apache Ain't Shit is the only studio album by American rapper Apache. It was released in 1993 via Tommy Boy/Warner Bros. Records. Recording sessions took place at Unique Recording Studios in New York. Production was handled by S.I.D. Reynolds, Double J, Diamond D, Large Professor, Q-Tip, The 45 King, and Apache himself, with Benny Medina, Queen Latifah and Sha-Kim serving as executive producers. It features guest appearances from Nikki D, Cee, Collie Weed, Cut Monitor Milo, Double J, Latee, The Jigaboos, The My Dick Posse, Treach and Vin Rock.

The album peaked at number 69 on the Billboard 200 and number 15 on the Top R&B/Hip-Hop Albums. One charting single was released from the album, the Q-Tip-produced hit "Gangsta Bitch", which made it to No. 67 on the Billboard Hot 100, No. 49 on the Hot R&B/Hip-Hop Singles & Tracks and No. 11 on the Hot Rap Singles. Another single titled "Do fa Self" was also released, but it did not chart. The album is now out of print.

While noting that the lyrics may have been humor not intended to be taken seriously, AllMusic still criticized the album's racist anti-white themes, such as those in the song "Kill D'White People".

Track listing 

Sample credits
Track 4 contains a sample of "Love and Happiness", performed by Monty Alexander
Track 7 contains a sample of "Britches", performed by The Meters
Track 10 contains a sample of "Who's Gonna Take the Weight", performed by Kool & the Gang
Track 14 contains a sample of "Stone Junkies", performed by Curtis Mayfield

Charts

References

External links

1993 debut albums
Tommy Boy Records albums
Albums produced by Diamond D
Albums produced by the 45 King
Albums produced by Large Professor
Albums produced by Q-Tip (musician)